The Abdal Bridge is a stone arch bridge in Bursa, Turkey.  It was constructed in 1669 to carry the road to Mudanya across the Nilüfer River.  Today it connects the Acemler and  Hürriyet quarters of Bursa.   The bridge was restored in 1971, and has been closed to vehicles since 1978.

The bridge was built at the instigation of a merchant called Abdal Çelebi, who was a Sufi follower (Murid) of Niyâzî-i Mısrî.   The construction took three years.   It is constructed of sandstone, and comprises twelve arches.   These were only partially visible before the restoration, since the ends were filled in with soil.

It incorporates a stone parapet on its northern side and an inscription at its middle point. This dates from 1984 when the bridge underwent further restoration, and gives the year of construction for the bridge as 1667.

References

Ottoman bridges in Turkey
Arch bridges in Turkey
Pedestrian bridges in Turkey
Stone bridges in Turkey
Buildings and structures in Bursa
Buildings and structures completed in 1669
Bridges completed in the 17th century
Tourist attractions in Bursa
Deck arch bridges
Transport in Bursa
Ottoman architecture in Bursa